{{Speciesbox
| image = 
| image_caption = 
| taxon = Phyllonorycter tenerella| authority =  (de Joannis, 1915)
| synonyms = Lithocolletis tenerella de Joannis, 1915Lithocolletis tenella Zeller, 1846
}}Phyllonorycter tenerella is a moth of the family Gracillariidae. It is found from Sweden to the Pyrenees, Italy and Bulgaria and from Great Britain to north-western Russia and Ukraine.

The wingspan is 6–8 mm. There are two generations per year with adults on wing in May and again from July to August.

The larvae feed on Carpinus betulus and Ostrya carpinifolia. They mine the leaves of their host plant. They create a narrow, finally tubular lower-surface mine between two side veins. The lower epidermis has one strong fold. The pupa is made in a flimsy cocoon in a corner of the mine. The frass is deposited in the opposite corner. In Ostrya'', the mine is shorter and less constrained by the lateral veins.

References

tenerella
Moths of Europe
Moths described in 1915